The Challenge, also known as Doctor's House Call, is an upcoming Russian space drama film co-written and directed by Klim Shipenko and partially filmed aboard the International Space Station. Alongside Yulia Peresild, starring as a surgeon sent to space to help a sick cosmonaut, the film's cast includes Miloš Biković and Vladimir Mashkov. The film crew was accompanied by Anton Shkaplerov, cosmonauts Oleg Novitsky, Pyotr Dubrov, and Mark T. Vande Hei.

This is the first collaboration between the Russian space corporation Roscosmos and the public broadcaster Channel One. The approximate budget of the film was 1.155 billion rubles for 2 weeks of filming.

It is the first feature-length fiction film to be filmed in space by professional film-makers, and is scheduled to be theatrically released in Russia on 20 April 2023 by Central Partnership.

Plot
Cosmonaut Ivanov loses consciousness while aboard the International Space Station. Doctors decide that it will be necessary to perform heart surgery in space, and cardiac surgeon Zhenya Belyaeva, who does not have time to raise her three-year-old daughter, is preparing for the flight.

Cast
 Yulia Peresild as Evgenia 'Zhenya' Belyaeva, a cardiac surgeon and cosmonaut
 Miloš Biković as Vladislav Nikolaev
 Vladimir Mashkov as a constructor
 Alyona Mordovina as a cosmonaut
 Sergey Burunov
 Polina Agureeva
 Aleksandr Baluev
 Igor Gordin
 Alexey Barabash
 Yelena Valyushkina as Galina

Cameos
 Oleg Novitsky as Cosmonaut Ivanov (the sick cosmonaut)
 Anton Shkaplerov as a cosmonaut
 Pyotr Dubrov as a cosmonaut
 Mark T. Vande Hei as a cosmonaut

Production

Background and pre-production
The screening process began on 15 March 2021, as a joint project between Roscosmos, Channel One, and Yellow, Black and White. The streaming service START is taking part in the creation of the tape. The filming equipment was launched on Progress MS-17 and returned on Soyuz MS-18.

According to Konstantin Ernst, Director General or CEO of Channel One, the motivation of the filmmakers is to confirm Russia's leadership in the space sector and to restore the prestige of the cosmonaut profession in the eyes of the younger generation (Yulia Peresild herself did not dream of space flight as a child). The unique experience of express training for non-professional flight may subsequently be useful for the real need to send scientists or doctors into space. The development of the project will be covered within the framework of the Evening Urgant program, whose members moved to the cosmodrome a week before launch.

About three thousand applications were submitted for the main role, for which Peresild was ultimately chosen. On 14 May, the Interagency Committee approved the composition of the ISS main and alternate crews for the period 2021–2023. Cosmonaut Anton Shkaplerov was chosen to be the ship's commander, while Klim Shipenko and Peresild flew as spaceflight participants. The backup crew was cosmonaut Oleg Artemyev, cameraman Alexey Dudin and actress Alyona Mordovina, Mordovina being the first woman to pass the cosmonaut screening since 2012. Due to the allocation of seats on flights to the International Space Station, the flight of the director and actress necessitated rearranging mission lengths of the professional astronauts and cosmonauts, including extending the mission length of the on-orbit crew, U.S. astronaut Mark Vande Hei and his Russian cosmonaut opposite number, from 6 months to 1 year.

The crew members began training at the Yuri Gagarin Cosmonaut Training Center on 24 May. To prepare for filming, Shipenko trained intensively, dropping  of weight. On 23 July, the prime crew participated in a four-hour simulation inside a Soyuz replica while wearing the Sokol suit, and on 28 July, the back-up crew completed the same exercise. According to back-up commander Artemyev, the performance of the two back-up spaceflight participants was outstanding. 

The dress-rehearsals for the movie happened after the scheduled spaceflight training each day. On 30 July, the spacecraft had its pre-launch preparation started, and on 31 August, the medical committee announced that both the main and reserve crew were healthy for space flight.

On 12 September, First Channel aired a reality show called The Challenge: The first in space, about the specifics of the selection and training of project participants.

In Space

Principal photography began on 5 October, when Shkaplerov, Peresild, and Shipenko flew to the ISS aboard the Soyuz-2.1a launch vehicle with the Soyuz MS-19 manned transport spacecraft from the Baikonur Cosmodrome in Baikonur, Kazakhstan. While on the ISS, Klim Shipenko shot about 30 hours of material (30–40 minutes of film), as well as performing the functions of director, art director, makeup artist, and production designer. Oleg Novitsky and Pyotr Dubrov will appear in the film, with Dubrov and Mark Vande Hei assisting in the production. Shkaplerov will also appear in some scenes.

Of all the footage filmed in space, about 30% was filmed in the Nauka module, another third was filmed in the Zvezda module, and the remaining 30% was shot on the rest of ISS modules. It is planned that the footage filmed in space will be approximately 35 minutes of the final timing of the film.

They left the ISS on 17 October, aboard Soyuz MS-18, with Commander Oleg Novitsky. After the successful landing of Soyuz MS-18, Dmitry Rogozin revealed that Ernst had paid Roscosmos for Shipenko and Peresild's seats.

Post-flight
The ground-based filming started in Moscow and the region of Moscow Oblast in mid-June 2022 and ended in October, the last footage filmed at the world's largest operating Baikonur Cosmodrome. Some of the locations the crew filmed were the Yuri Gagarin Cosmonaut Training Center and the Voronovo sanatorium. In addition, a pavilion was erected specifically for the film, imitating the RKA Mission Control Center of the Roscosmos State Corporation. Here, Miloš Biković, the star of Klim Shipenko's film Serf, joined the film crew.

Reactions
The film, which according to Dmitry Rogozin, head of Roscosmos, is an "experiment to see if Roscosmos can prepare two ordinary people to fly in about 3 or 4 months" has received opposition from the scientific and aerospace communities, as to the fact that they remove trained cosmonauts from their flights, a misuse of public money, or even that using the station's resources for non-scientific purposes would be illegal. Sergei Krikalev, director of crewed programs at Roscosmos, reportedly lost his position by speaking out against the project, but was reinstated after a few days following protests from cosmonauts on and off active duty.

Release

Marketing
On New Year's Eve, Channel One released the first musical number, and the first teaser trailer was released on 1 January 2023.
The second trailer was released on 7 March 2023.

Theatrical 
The Challenge is planned to be released by distributors since Central Partnership company, which is part of the Gazprom-Media holding in the Russian Federation is scheduled to be shown in theaters across the country on 12 April, but was later postponed to 20 April 2023.

Notes

References

Bibliography

External links
 Official website 
 

2020s Russian-language films
Films directed by Klim Shipenko
Films shot in space
Films about astronauts
Films about physicians
Films about space programs
Russian drama films
International Space Station
Space tourism
Roscosmos
Moon in film
Mars in film
Films set on spacecraft
Films shot in Moscow
Films shot in Moscow Oblast
Films shot in Russia
Films shot in Kazakhstan
Upcoming Russian-language films